Sexual arousal disorder is characterized by a lack or absence of sexual fantasies and desire for sexual activity in a situation that would normally produce sexual arousal, or the inability to attain or maintain typical responses to sexual arousal. The disorder is found in the DSM-IV. The condition should not be confused with a sexual desire disorder.

The term is often used in the diagnosis of women (female sexual arousal disorder), while the term erectile dysfunction (ED) is often used for men.

Signs and symptoms
In women, the symptoms of the disorder include:
 Lack of vaginal lubrication
 Lack of vaginal dilation or lengthening
 Decreased genital tumescence or swelling
 Decreased genital or nipple sensation

However, whether lack of physiological arousal is a reliable symptom of the disorder is questionable. Research has shown that women with arousal deficits and women without arousal deficits show equivalent increases in physiological response during experience of erotic stimuli.

Causes
Contrary to popular belief, the disorder is not always caused from a lack of sexual arousal. Possible causes of the disorder include psychological and emotional factors, such as depression, anger, and stress; relationship factors, such as conflict or lack of trust; medical factors, such as depleted hormones, reduced regional blood flow, and nerve damage; and drug use. The lack of sexual arousal may be due to a general lack of sexual desire or due to a lack of sexual desire for the current partner (i.e., situational).  A person may always have had no or low sexual desire or the lack of desire may have been acquired during the person's life.

Certain medications like SSRIs may contribute to a loss of sexual arousal, either while taking the medication or during withdrawal. In seemingly rare cases, SSRIs have been reported to cause an reduction in sexual arousal that last months or years after discontinuation, a condition termed post-SSRI sexual dysfunction (PSSD).

Diagnosis
A psychologist will first consider any psychological or emotional problems; while a sex therapist will examine relationship issues; after which a medical doctor will investigate medical causes for the disorder. In order to receive this diagnosis, a woman must, for at least 6 months, report at least 3 of the following symptoms: absent or significantly reduced interest in sexual activity, in sexual or erotic thoughts or fantasies, in initiation of sex or receptiveness to sex, in excitement or pleasure in most sexual encounters, in sexual responsiveness to erotic cues, or in genital or non-genital responses to sexual activity. This can be either lifelong or acquired.

Treatment
Depending on the cause of the disorder, hormone therapy or a blood-flow enhancing medication, like Viagra, may be appropriate.

Bremelanotide (formerly PT-141) is being studied in clinical tests to increase sexual desire in women. In 2014, Palatin, the company developing the drug, announced the beginning of a Phase 3 clinical trial to determine its effectiveness.

References

See also
 Erectile dysfunction
 Female sexual arousal disorder
 Hypoactive sexual desire disorder

Sexual disorders
Non-sexuality